Rolf von Goth (5 November 1906 – 9 November 1981) was a film actor from Windhoek in German Southwest Africa who settled and worked in Germany. After appearing in minor roles in several silent films such as Metropolis (1927) von Goth emerged as a prominent actor in the late 1920s. During the early 1930s he played a mixture of leading and supporting roles in films such as Once There Was a Waltz and A Shot at Dawn (1932) but his appearances began to decline during the Nazi era. By the outbreak of the Second World War he had almost entirely retired from film. von Goth switched to become a director of radio shows, becoming extremely successful in the format during the post-war years. He was married to the actress Karin Hardt.

Selected filmography
 Metropolis (1927)
 Don Juan in a Girls' School (1928)
 Under Suspicion (1928)
 Misled Youth (1929)
 Spring Awakening (1929)
 Father and Son (1929)
 Next, Please! (1930)
 Boycott (1930)
 Of Life and Death (1930)
 The King of Paris (1930)
 Between Night and Dawn (1931)
 Circus Life (1931)
 A Shot at Dawn (1932)
 Once There Was a Waltz (1932)
 Sehnsucht 202 (1932)
 Five from the Jazz Band (1932)
 The Master Detective (1933)
 A Woman With Power of Attorney (1934)
 The Castle in Flanders (1936)

References

External links

Bibliography
 Grange, William. Cultural Chronicle of the Weimar Republic. Scarecrow Press, 2008.  
 Youngkin, Stephen.  The Lost One: A Life of Peter Lorre. University Press of Kentucky, 2005.

1906 births
1981 deaths
German male film actors
German male silent film actors
People from Windhoek
20th-century German male actors